Eric Hoffmann (born 21 June 1984) is a Luxembourgian football player who last played for FC Lorentzweiler.

Club career
Hoffmann started his career at lower league side Orania Vianden before joining Etzella for the 2002/2003 season. He won promotion to the Luxembourg National Division in his first season and lost two successive cup finals in 2003 and 2004.

International career
He made his debut for Luxembourg in a March 2002 friendly match against Latvia, aged 17 and still only playing at Orania Vianden in Luxembourg's third division. At the end of his international career he had earned 88 caps, scoring no goals. He played in 15 FIFA World Cup qualification matches.

External links

References

1984 births
Living people
Luxembourgian footballers
Luxembourg international footballers
Association football fullbacks
FC Etzella Ettelbruck players
Jeunesse Esch players
FC UNA Strassen players
US Hostert players
FC Lorentzweiler players
Luxembourg National Division players
People from Ettelbruck